Bhoothalingaswamy Temple is at Boothapandi. Boothapandi is the headquarters of Thovalai taluk in Kanyakumari District, India. The village sits on the western bank of the river Pazhaiyar, at the foot of the hill known as Thadakaimalai which is considered to be the abode of Thadakai in the Ramayana. It forms a place of legendary importance.

The Travancore Manual says that Bhoothapandi is an ancient place founded by one of the pandya sovereigns and vague traditions are preserved in the Keralopatti and Kerala Mahamiyam wherein the Pandiya invasion of Keral if referred to in a mythical form.

The Mahatmiyam says that the Pandyas invaded Kerala with an army of Bhuthatans (spirits) and they were defeated by Parasurama, the warrior sage. The boundary of Kerala and Pandya kingdoms was fixed at Bhoothapandy as a compromise. A later interpretation brought to bear upon the Parasurama legend is that it is an allegoric representation of the advent of the Aryans into Kerala.

The temple was constructed by the King Pasum Pon Pandyan who is the son of Boothapandiyan.

The Suampu lingam lord of sanctuary's other name is Salian Kanda Thirumani. In the 17th century Saliar caste peoples lived in the town. A member of the community was worried that his cow was being milked by some unknown person. One day he followed the cow and discovered it discharging milk on a bush. Enraged at this he destroyed the bush where he found a stone idol. He slashed the idol and found it bleeding. So they decided to construct a temple for the stone idol[Lord Siva] so this lord of sanctuary is called Salian Kanda Thirumani.

Structure of the temple
The temple faces east and there is a tank with a small Mandapa on the northern side. The presiding deity is called Bhoothalingaswamy. The sanctorum of the temple is a crude cell excavated on the eastern face of a huge irregular mass of rock. The linga is also carved in the same rock. There is no vimana over this shrine. The ardhamandapa and mahamandapa were only later additions. The rock is grit round by a thick stonewall which gives it the appearance of a minor fort. On the right side of entrance to the sanctum is the image of Vinayak and the image of Nandi is in front of the linga. On the right side of Nandi facing south is Nataraja with Sivakami ambal. Adithyan, Subramanian with valli and Deyvanai, Sandikeswarar are other deities of the temple.

Outside the prakaram(outer courtyard), anyone will be allowed pooja to the Kasi Viswanathar and Ulagayanayagi. Besides the Bhuthalingaswamy is a separate shrine dedicated to Sivakami Ambal for which there is a small vimana above the shrine.

History
History says the formation of the Bhuthalingam is based on a story.

Bhoothalinga Swamy is named as Saliyar Kanda Thirumeeni. Long ago, Bhoothapandy was a little forest surrounded with bushes and trees.  A man who belonged to the caste of Saliyar had four cows and sent the cows to the forest every morning for their food and run them back to home at evening.

Among the cows one did not give milk to the man daily. The man thought he saw a hiker draw his cows milk daily. He followed the cow the next day. He saw that the cow went to a long grass bush and drew its milk automatically. He was shocked to see this, and cut the bushes with an
iron cutter. He was shocked that the iron cutter was full of blood. He was scared by that and called all the people. Together they removed the bushes and they saw a lord Siva sculpture created by Suyambulingam (Saliyar Kanda Thirumeeni). The king built a temple beyond that became the Bhoothalingaswamy temple. The temple is Kudaivu Kovil (built inside rock).

Sculpture glory
The front of Sivagami Ambal shrine is the best example of its sculpture. The Manmathan and rathi are attractive to view. The chain is made from stone. The Ramayana says Rama killed Vaali from behind. If stood in front, Rama Vaali's image can be seen, but if the observer is in front of Vaali's image, then Rama's image cannot be seen. A beautiful piece of art in the temple lies in the wooden Kalyanamedai the Mandapa. It has been made so skillfully that the joints are invisible. The medai contains numerous multi-colored images. a Srichakram is engraved on the panel of pillar in the Kalyanamandpa. There is no inner prakaram for both the shrines. On the south west corner of the common Prakaram of the shrines is Vinayaga who is locally called "Ninaithathai Mudikkum Vinayakar".

Car Festival
Yearly in the month of Thai (Tamil calendar month from the mid of January to the mid of February), Thai (தை) (Tamil month), all members in Bhuthapandy and its surrounding members allot a committee to celebrate a car festival. It runs for ten days. Daily at night there is katcheri, Orchestra, Bharatham dance by kids Competition, Light arrangement around four streets (rathaveethy). Fourth day and seventh day Thiruvila is a great moment with elephants, Horse Bhavani, Siringari melam, Muthu kodai Bhavani. There are Kolam competitions for all women and girls around streets. The ninth day is Therotam where three cars are decorated by garlands and the lord Bhoothalinga swamy is kept in the big car, Ganapathy and Amman are in the small car.

Route
The route to reach the place from the District Capital Nagercoil is Nagercoil - Vadasery - Putheri - Erachakulam - Easanthimangalam -Thuvarancaud - Bhoothapandi (totalling nine kilometres).

See also
 Boothapandi
Kanyakumari district
Salir cast in Tamil Nadu

External links

 Bhoothapandi Nagercoil - Temples in Nagercoil

Hindu temples in Kanyakumari district
Nagercoil